Moriyama is a city in Shiga Prefecture, Japan.

Moriyama may also refer to:

Places
Moriyama-ku, Nagoya, a ward of Nagoya, Aichi Prefecture, Japan
Moriyama, Nagasaki, a former town in Kitatakaki District, Nagasaki Prefecture, Japan
Moriyama Domain, a former domain of Japan in Mutsu Province

Other uses
Moriyama (surname)
Moriyama Station (disambiguation), multiple railway stations in Japan
Moriyama-juku, a station of the Nakasendō in Moriyama, Shiga Prefecture, Japan